The 1981 Thai military rebellion was a military coup attempt to consolidate power by the government of Prem Tinsulanonda, staged by Thai military leaders of Class 7 on 1 April 1981, but a counter-coup by Prem, Arthit Kamlang-ek, and support by the royal family on 3 April led to the coup's failure, turning it into a rebellion. In Thailand, it is known as the "Young Turk Rebellion", referring to the group of military officers that led the coup, or more mockingly as the "April Fools' Day Rebellion", referring to the date of the coup along with its failure. The coup attempt failed despite garnering the support of as many as 42 battalions, the most in Thai history.

Background
Field officers from the Armed Forces Academies Preparatory School Class 7, known as the "Young Turks", including Manoonkrit Roopkachorn, Prajak Sawangjit, and Chamlong Srimuang, were involved in 1976 Thai coup d'état as a significant force and helped Kriangsak Chamanan become prime minister. Later when Kriangsak became unpopular, they strongly supported and helped Prem Tinsulanonda, the northeast army leader, become Prime Minister of Thailand in 1980. Prem realized that he should not depend on Class 7 only and began to seek for another class's support.

Prelude 
On 31 March 1981, Class 7 leaders visited Prem in the night to ask him lead a coup on 1 April but Prem refused. Arthit Kamlang-ek, a deputy commander of the 2nd army region, was informed of the coup plan. Arthit telephoned Queen Sirikit. Sirikit then ordered the coup planning group to let Prem come to the royal palace.

Coup
On 1 April 1981, Class 7 leaders led by San Jitpathima, deputy commander-in-chief of the army, staged a coup, calling themselves the "Revolutionary Council". Manoonkrit, secretary-general of the group, proclaimed reasons such as selfish politicians, social justice problems, and economic problems.

Prem went to Suranari Base of the 2nd Army Area in Nakhon Ratchasima Province with the Thai Royal Family, including King Bhumibol Adulyadej, in the morning, and set up a counter-coup with an assistance from Arthit. The influence of Royal Family helped Prem to get support from the second, third and fourth regional armies, the Royal Thai Navy, and the Royal Thai Air Force. The 21st Infantry Regiment, the Queen Guards, secretly entered Bangkok on 3 April and arrested the coup attempt leaders.

Aftermath 
Following the coup's failure, its leaders fled the country to various destinations. 52 were later given amnesty and had their military ranks restored. Having aided Prem in putting down the coup, Arthit was promoted to Commander of the 1st Army Area. Manoonkrit and the Young Turks would attempt another coup in 1985, which also failed.

See also
1991 Thai coup d'état

References

Citations

Sources

Rebellion
Rebellion
Attempted coups in Thailand
Thailand
Thai rebellion
rebellion Thai
20th-century rebellions